National Route 352 is a national highway of Japan connecting Kashiwazaki, Niigata and Kaminokawa, Tochigi in Japan, with a total length of 329 km (204.43 mi).

Route description
A section of National Route 352 in the city of Uonuma in Niigata Prefecture is a musical road.

References

National highways in Japan
Roads in Fukushima Prefecture
Roads in Niigata Prefecture
Roads in Tochigi Prefecture
Musical roads in Japan